Rimorso is a 1952 Italian melodrama film.

Cast
Maria Grazia Francia as Maria	
Otello Toso as Corrado Anselmi
Linda Sini as Tamara
Mirko Ellis as Luciano
Agostino Salvietti	as Raffaele
Tina Pica	as Assunta
Enzo Maggio as Gennaro
Ignazio Balsamo as Police Commissioner

External links
 

1952 films
1950s Italian-language films
Italian drama films
1952 drama films
Melodrama films
1950s Italian films